Lae Atoll (Marshallese:) is a coral atoll of 20 islands in the Pacific Ocean, and forms a legislative district of the Ralik Chain of the Marshall Islands.
The population of Lae Atoll was 347 in 2011. Its islands include Lae, Looj (Lotj), Bilalalon, Riblong (Ribon) and Lweijab (Lejab).

History

In early 1884, Japanese explorer and agent Suzuki Tsunenori was dispatched to Lae Atoll to investigate the murder of a Japanese sailor. When he arrived, he raised the national flag and claimed the island for Japan. However, he was ordered to return to the island to take down the flag, and the government made no formal gestures towards annexation of the islands. Lae Atoll was claimed by the Empire of Germany along with the rest of the Marshall Islands later that year, and the Germans established a trading outpost. After World War I, the island came under the South Seas Mandate of the Empire of Japan. Following the end of World War II, Lae came under the control of the United States as part of the Trust Territory of the Pacific Islands. It has been part of the independent Republic of the Marshall Islands since 1986.

Education
Marshall Islands Public School System operates Lae Elementary School.

Kwajalein Atoll High School on Kwajalein serves the community.

References

External links
Marshall Islands site

Atolls of the Marshall Islands
Ralik Chain
Municipalities of the Marshall Islands